The 1914 Western State Normal Hilltoppers football team was an American football team that represented Western State Normal School (later renamed Western Michigan University) during the 1914 college football season. In their eighth season under head coach William H. Spaulding (who later went on to coach at Minnesota and UCLA), the Hilltoppers compiled a perfect 6–0 record, shut out five of six opponents, and outscored all opponents by a combined total of 188 to 7.

Schedule

References

Western State Normal Hilltoppers
College football undefeated seasons
Western State Normal Hilltoppers football